Thiago Schmidel de Freitas (born 13 April 1987) is a Brazilian footballer.

Freitas has experience from AOT Alimos (A.O Trachones F.C.) where he played a half season in Greece's second division. Prior to Greece, de Freitas spent a year in Israel with Hapoel Nir Ramat HaSharon, collecting two goals and two assists in 18 matches. The well-travelled, 27-year-old central midfielder has played in a multiple countries that also include Hungary and Portugal.

"We've watched extensive video and highlight footage of Thiago," said former coach Colin Miller added. "He comes from an excellent background and an excellent football pedigree. There are players that I've spoken to from within our league that have said what a good player we are getting and we expect him to make an immediate impact. I think he'll be a terrific signing for us."

His playing career took him from Fluminense youth program to Europe, where he featured for clubs in Italy, Germany, Portugal, Hungary and Greece. He also had a stint with FC Edmonton in the NASL.

References

External links
 

1987 births
Living people
Brazilian footballers
Brazilian expatriate footballers
A.S.D. AVC Vogherese 1919 players
FC Edmonton players
Clube Oriental de Lisboa players
C.D. Cova da Piedade players
Ottawa Fury FC players
USL Championship players
Liga Portugal 2 players
Expatriate soccer players in Canada
North American Soccer League players
Brazilian expatriate sportspeople in Canada
Association football midfielders